Pierre Bailly (March 8, 1889 – January 25, 1973) was a French architect. In 1932 he won a gold medal in the art competitions of the Summer Olympic Games together with Gustave Saacké and Pierre Montenot for their design of a "Cirque pour Toros" ("Circus for Bullfights").

References

External links
 
 Pierre Bailly's biography at AGORHA 

1889 births
1973 deaths
20th-century French architects
Olympic gold medalists in art competitions
Medalists at the 1932 Summer Olympics
Olympic competitors in art competitions